Endless Love is a 2010 Philippine television drama romance series broadcast by GMA Network. The series is based on a 2000 South Korean television series, Autumn in My Heart. Directed by Mac Alejandre and Andoy Ranay, it stars Dingdong Dantes and Marian Rivera. It premiered on June 28, 2010 on the network's Telebabad line up replacing The Last Prince. The series concluded on October 15, 2010 with a total of 80 episodes. It was replaced by Beauty Queen in its timeslot.

The series is streaming online on YouTube.

Background

Autumn in My Heart is the first series installment in Yoon Seok-ho's four-part instalment titled Endless Love. It aired in South Korea through KBS2 from September 16 to November 7, 2000, running with 16 episodes.

The Philippine airing rights went to GMA Network back in late 2003. The drama aired two more times in 2004 and once more in 2006.

Production
In November 2009, GMA Network announced that they have acquired the adaptation rights of the Korean drama Autumn in My Heart, with Dingdong Dantes and Marian Rivera attached in the lead roles. In December 2009, director Joyce E. Bernal was hired to helm the project. A teaser trailer was shown during the 2009 Metro Manila Film Festival screening of GMA Films' Ang Panday.

Ryan Agoncillo, Paulo Avelino and Hero Angeles were all considered to take on the second lead male role before Dennis Trillo was eventually cast. Filming commenced in April 2010 for a June air date. The production also encountered an extensive delays causing Bernal to leave production and eventually replaced by Mac Alejandre; actress Gina Alajar left to pursue another role, whilst actor Christopher de Leon chose to focus on his political career in the meanwhile - both were replaced by Kuh Ledesma and Tirso Cruz III, respectively.

Cast and characters

Lead cast
 Dingdong Dantes as Johnny Dizon
 Marian Rivera as Jenny Dizon / Jenny Cruz-Dizon

Supporting cast
 Dennis Trillo as Andrew Tantoco
 Nadine Samonte as Shirley Cruz / Shirley Dizon
 Tirso Cruz III as Robert Dizon
 Sandy Andolong as Katherine Dizon
 Janice de Belen as Suzette "Suzy" Cruz
 Kuh Ledesma as Jackie Tantoco
 Gabby Eigenmann as Jojo Cruz
 Ces Quesada as Nora Ramirez
 Bernard Palanca as Raul Tuazon
 Marco Alcaraz as Nestor
 Mosang as Christine Santos
 Bela Padilla as Yumi Ramirez
 Janna Dominguez as Mylene Ortiz

Guest cast
 Kristofer Martin as young Johnny
 Lucho Ayala as young Jojo
 Kathryn Bernardo as young Jenny
 Joyce Ching as young Shirley
 John Nite as a doctor

Ratings
According to AGB Nielsen Philippines' Mega Manila People/Individual television ratings, the pilot episode of Endless Love earned a 15.8% rating. While the final episode scored a 15.1% rating.

Accolades

References

External links
 
 

2010 Philippine television series debuts
2010 Philippine television series endings
Filipino-language television shows
GMA Network drama series
Philippine romance television series
Philippine television series based on South Korean television series
Television shows set in the Philippines